The Lord Lewis Prize is awarded by the Royal Society of Chemistry for distinctive and distinguished chemical or scientific achievements together with significant contributions to the development of science policy. The recipient receives a medal, a certificate and a prize of £5,000.

The Lord Lewis Prize is awarded every two years to mark the substantial contributions that Professor Lord Lewis made to chemistry and science policy. The inaugural Lord Lewis Prize was awarded to Lord May of Oxford, former president of the Royal Society and chief scientific advisor to the UK Government, in 2008.

Recipients 
Source: Royal Society of Chemistry

 2008 – Lord Robert May
 2010 – Sir John Cadogan
 2012 – Sir David King 
 2014 – Sir John Holman
 2016 – Sir Martyn Poliakoff
 2018 – Luis Oro University of Zaragoza, CSIC
 2020 – Vernon C. Gibson
 2022 – Alastair Charles Lewis

See also

 List of chemistry awards

References 

Awards of the Royal Society of Chemistry
Awards established in 2008